Western Cemetery is  a Jewish cemetery at Bulls Cross Ride in Cheshunt in the Borough of Broxbourne, Hertfordshire EN7 5HT, England. It was established as the cemetery of the Western (now Western Marble Arch) Synagogue, as well as the independent West End Great Synagogue. It is now run by the Western Charitable Foundation, which extends burial rights to the Jewish Joint Burial Society, Liberal Judaism and Waltham Forest Hebrew Congregation. It has two prayer halls – The Barnett Ohel, dating from 1967, and the Gee Ohel.

Notable interments include the grave of leading writer and theologian Rabbi Louis Jacobs (1920–2006), the founder of Masorti (Conservative) Judaism in the UK, who is buried alongside his wife Sophie (Shulamit) (1921–2005).

Gallery

See also
Jewish cemeteries in the London area
Jewish communities in the United Kingdom

Notes

References

External links
Official website

1968 establishments in England
Western Cemetery (Cheshunt)
Cemeteries in Hertfordshire
Cheshunt
Jewish cemeteries in the United Kingdom
Religion in Hertfordshire